The Fourth Annual Jim Crockett Sr. Memorial Cup Tag Team Tournament, or more commonly the Crockett Cup (2019), was a professional wrestling tournament that took place on April 27, 2019, at the Cabarrus Arena in Concord, North Carolina. The eight team single elimination tournament was co-produced by the National Wrestling Alliance (NWA) and Ring of Honor (ROH).

Also on the card, Nick Aldis defended the NWA World Heavyweight Championship against Marty Scurll, and the NWA Women's Championship and NWA National Championship were also defended.

Production

Background
The Jim Crockett Sr. Memorial Cup Tag Team Tournament (commonly known simply as the Crockett Cup) is a tag team professional wrestling tournament first held in April 1986. National Wrestling Alliance (NWA) member Jim Crockett Promotions (JCP), headed by Jim Crockett Jr., hosted the Crockett Cup, held in honor of Crockett's father, JCP founder Jim Crockett Sr. and saw participation of teams from various NWA territories. JCP held the tournament again in 1987 and 1988, before JCP was sold to Ted Turner later that year. In July 2017, the Crockett Foundation, with Classic Pro Wrestling, held the "Crockett Foundation Cup Tag Team Tournament" in New Kent, Virginia, which was not affiliated with the NWA. Bobby Fulton, The Barbarian, and The Rock 'n' Roll Express, all former Crockett Cup participants, took part in the event as a link to the original tournaments.

The original concept of the Crockett Cup was a single elimination tag team tournament, with the storyline prize of $1,000,000.00 given to the winning team along with a large trophy. The 1986 and 1987 tournaments featured 24 teams, while the 1988 version had 22 teams competing. Each tournament was split over 2 shows to encompass all 23 tournament matches as well as non-tournament matches, in 1986 JCP held a show in the afternoon and another in the evening, while the 1987 and 1988 tournaments were spread out over two days instead.

In October 2018, during the NWA 70th Anniversary Show, it was announced that the Crockett Cup would be returning in 2019. It was later revealed that the event would take place on April 27, 2019, at Cabarrus Arena in Concord, North Carolina. The event will be co-produced by the NWA and Ring of Honor (ROH).

Storylines
The event featured a number professional wrestling matches with different wrestlers involved in pre-existing scripted feuds, plots and storylines. Wrestlers are portrayed as either heels (those that portray the "bad guys"), faces (the "good guy" characters) or tweeners (characters that is neither clearly a heel or a face) as they follow a series of tension-building events, which culminated in a wrestling match or series of matches as determined by the promotion.

At the NWA New Years Clash, The War Kings (Crimson and Jax Dane) (with Road Warrior Animal) defeated Caleb Konley and Jay Bradley to become the first team to qualify for the 2019 Crockett Cup. From January 24 to 26, 2019, Ring of Honor held a 12-team Tag Wars tournament as part of their Road To G1 Supercard tour of Texas. Villain Enterprises (Brody King and PCO) won the three-day tournament by defeating The Kingdom (Vinny Marseglia and T. K. O'Ryan) in the first round, The Bouncers (Brian Milonas and Beer City Bruiser) and the team of Kenny King and MVP in the second round, and Lifeblood (Juice Robinson and David Finlay) in the finals to earn a spot in the Crockett Cup as well as a match for the ROH World Tag Team Championship.

On February 8, 2019 it was announced that ROH partner promotions Consejo Mundial de Lucha Libre (CMLL) out of Mexico, and New Japan Pro-Wrestling (NJPW) from Japan would also be sending  teams for the 2019 Crockett Cup.

Results

Crockett Cup brackets

References

External links
 

 

2019 in North Carolina
2019 in professional wrestling
April 2019 events in the United States
Events in North Carolina
Events in Concord, North Carolina
National Wrestling Alliance shows
Ring of Honor shows
Professional wrestling in North Carolina
Professional wrestling joint events
2019